Olga Yuryevna Dykhovichnaya, born Golyak (born 4 September 1980) is a Belarusian and Russian actress, producer and director.

Biography
Graduated in 1997 from Belarusian State University Olga worked on Belarusian television as a host of the program “Morning Cocktail” (Утренний коктейль). Then she moved to Moscow and worked in the TV company VID while doing her studies in the workshop of Aleksei Yuryevich German (1938–2013) and Svetlana Igorevna Karmalita (1940–2017). Olga became a famous actress, producer and director. In the early 2000s, she worked in the studio Volia (Воля), where she directed a number of documentary films. In 2010 she became producer of International Independent Film Festival 2morrow/Завтра and also a producer of 2morrowFilms film company. As an actress she is best known for a lead role in a controversial film Twilight Portrait (Портрет в сумерках) (2011), where she also took a part as a co-writer and co-producer. Twilight Portrait premiered at Venice Film Festival, and among numerous awards at film festivals worldwide received a Nomination «Discovery of the Year» by European Film Academy.

Filmography: actress

Filmography: director
 2011 Writers and producer: Twilight Portrait
 2014 Writers: Welcome Home

References

External links

https://www.starhit.ru/story/smert-muja-rejissera-ot-raka-konchina-pasyinka-sluhi-ob-odnopolom-brake-neizvestnaya-olya-dyihovichnaya-250691/
http://www.snob.ru/magazine/entry/54654#comment_539720
https://www.kino-teatr.ru/kino/acter/w/ros/1375/bio/
https://www.film.ru/person/olga-dyhovichnaya

1980 births
Living people
Actors from Minsk
Belarusian film actresses
Russian film actresses
Television directors
Belarusian television actresses
Russian television actresses
Russian women film directors
20th-century Belarusian actresses
20th-century Russian actresses
21st-century Russian actresses
Film people from Minsk
Women television directors